Mehdi Kacem, also known as Medhi Kacem, (born 8 August 1986 in Mantes-la-Jolie, Yvelines) is a French-born Algerian football midfielder. He currently plays for USM Blida in the Algerian Ligue Professionnelle 2.

References

1986 births
Living people
People from Mantes-la-Jolie
Algerian footballers
French footballers
Amiens SC players
FC Gueugnon players
Real Murcia players
ES Sétif players
French sportspeople of Algerian descent
Ligue 2 players
French expatriate sportspeople in Algeria
JSM Béjaïa players
Algerian Ligue Professionnelle 1 players
RC Arbaâ players
Association football midfielders
Footballers from Yvelines